M83 is the debut studio album by French electropop band M83, released on 18 April 2001 on Gooom. The album was reissued on 6 September 2005 on Mute Records for its North American release, and is thus sometimes referred to as 0905.

Produced by both M83 and Morgan Daguenet, the album is predominantly instrumental, with dialogue samples from various films and television programmes appearing across the songs. The track titles, if read sequentially, form a short story.

Background and recording
Recorded as a duo by founding members, Anthony Gonzalez and Nicolas Fromageau, the album was recorded at Echotone, in the Autumn of 2000, with co-producer Morgan Daguenet. The track "Slowly", included on the album's 2005 reissue, was recorded two years later at the same location.

Track listing

Notes
 Original copies of the album contain a version of "Night" that samples German dialogue from the film Nosferatu the Vampyre at the beginning of the song. The version on the 2005 Mute re-release does not feature the sample and thus is slightly over a minute shorter (4:44), bringing the total length of the album to 70:23.
 The sampled dialogue in "Facing That" is from the film It Conquered the World.
 The first few seconds of "Violet Tree" features a sample of audio from episode two of Serial Experiments Lain. A few seconds of opening dialogue from the same episode can be heard at the beginning of "Caresses".
 The sampled dialogue at the beginning of "I'm Getting Closer" is from the film I Was a Teenage Werewolf.
 The sampled dialogue in "I'm Getting Closer" is from the film Buffalo '66 and is played in reverse.
 The sampled dialogue in "She Stands Up" is from the film Paris, Texas.
 The sampled dialogue in "Caresses" is from the film Mark of the Vampire.
 On the last track, at 15:10, there is a hidden track, which consists of several minutes of static followed by an outro.
 Track names can be read in order, describing an event at a party.

Personnel
M83
Anthony Gonzalez
Nicolas Fromageau

Recording personnel
M83 − production, mixing
Morgan Daguenet − production, mixing

Artwork
Stylophone − design

References

2001 debut albums
M83 (band) albums
Mute Records albums